The elegant lobulia (Lobulia lobulus) is a species of skink found in New Guinea.

References

Lobulia
Reptiles described in 1945
Taxa named by Arthur Loveridge